Gadzhiyevo is a town under the administrative jurisdiction of the closed administrative-territorial formation of Alexandrovsk in Murmansk Oblast, Russia. Population:  

It was previously known as Yagelnaya Guba (until 1967), Gadzhiyevo (until 1981), Murmansk-130 (until 1994), Skalisty (until 1999).

History
First mentioned in 1957, it was known as Yagelnaya Guba until 1967 and as Skalisty from 1981 to 1994, although it was often referred to as Murmansk-130. The name Skalisty was made official in 1994, but in 1999 the town was renamed back to Gadzhiyevo—the name it previously bore from 1967 to 1981. The current name is in honor of Magomet Gadzhiyev, a distinguished World War II submarine Commanding Officer.

Gadzhiyevo was granted town status (as Skalisty) in 1981.

Administrative and municipal status
Within the framework of administrative divisions, Gadzhiyevo is subordinated to the closed administrative-territorial formation of Alexandrovsk—an administrative unit with the status equal to that of the districts. Within the framework of municipal divisions, the town of Gadzhiyevo is a part of Alexandrovsk Urban Okrug.

References

Notes

Sources
Official website of Murmansk Oblast. Registry of the Administrative-Territorial Structure of Murmansk Oblast

External links

Gadzhiyevo Business Directory 

Cities and towns in Murmansk Oblast
Russian and Soviet Navy bases
Closed cities